Iman Mutlaq is a Jordanian entrepreneur, financier and social activist. She is the founder of the Sigma Investments Group.

Early life
Mutlaq was born in Saudi Arabia. Following her father's death when she was six years old, she was raised by her mother. She sold arts and crafts at school when she was 14 years old to support her education.

Family
Mutlaq raised her two sons as a single mother after her divorce at the age of twenty four.

Education
Mutlaq received an MBA in finance from the New York Institute of Technology.

Career
Mutlaq established her export-import business at the age of eighteen and then entered the financial industry at the age of 27 covering the regions of Middle East and North Africa. She is currently managing Jordan based Sigma Investments.

She directs Ingot Consultation Bahrain, a financial services provider since 2015 focusing in the MENA region; and enables trading on global currencies and precious metals, and also helps clients reach foreign exchange markets.

She is involved in angel investing in projects which enhance women's creativity and ideas. She is also targeting applications for mobile devices through her startup, Dreamtech since 2015.

Activism and women's empowerment

Participant in an expedition to Mount Kilimanjaro in 2014 in an effort to support the cancer research initiatives of the King Hussein Cancer Center; the expedition raised $1.3 million.

First instructor of the Art of Living Foundation, an initiative of Sri Sri Ravi Shankar in Jordan.

President of the Geneva International Association for Human Values in Jordan.

Initiator of six programs in Iraq among 400 women for advancing their careers.

Participant at the inaugural US Presidential Summit on Entrepreneurship invited by The Obama Administration in 2010; she met Hillary Clinton and Richard Holbrooke there and discussed issues affecting women in Afghanistan and across the Middle East.

Sigma Investments Group

Sigma Investments and Ingot are members of the three member consortium which signed cooperation protocol with Egyptian government to establish a US$35–50m worth electronic Egyptian Commodities Exchange in Egypt as the first ever country in the MENA region; it will facilitate the well being of the small farmers and supply of products at reasonable prices abolishing the monopoly of goods.

Achievements and awards
’Outstanding Woman Financial Innovation Leader in Middle East’ at the ‘Asian Digital Finance Forum and Awards’ in 2022.

Forbes magazine's Middle East edition, published in 2020 ranked Iman Mutlaq to 30th position in a list of "Power Businesswomen in The Middle East 2020”.
Forbes magazine's Middle East edition, published in 2019 ranked Iman Mutlaq to 18th position in a list of "Women Leading Top Companies in the Middle East”.
Forbes magazine's Middle East edition, published in 2016, 2017 and 2018 ranked Iman Mutlaq to 32nd, 41st and 38th positions respectively in a list of "The 100 Most Powerful Arab Businesswomen."
Keynote Speaker at the first "Asia-Pacific Executives Forum" which was held at Hilton Hotel in Sri Lanka in 2017.
Best Woman in the Corporate Sector at the AmCham MENA Council Women in Business Awards in 2016.
Global Alliance Partners, a network of financial entities has elected Iman as the first female director at its Conference in New York City in 2016.
 Jordan's Top Businesswomen in 2015.
 Iman has been appointed "Goodwill Ambassador for Human Rights and Peace" in Jordan in 2014.

References

External links

Living people
Jordanian businesspeople
New York Institute of Technology alumni
Year of birth missing (living people)